Cyrus Griffin (July 16, 1748 – December 14, 1810), a Virginia lawyer and politician, was the final President of the Congress of the Confederation and first United States district judge of the United States District Court for the District of Virginia.

Education and career

Born on July 16, 1748, to the former Mary Anne Bertrand and her husband Col. Leroy Griffin in Farnham Parish (now Farnham), then in Lancaster County (which became part of Richmond County in his lifetime), Colony of Virginia, British America, Griffin had a slightly older brother Samuel Griffin who also became a Virginia lawyer, and Continental Army officer before beginning a political career that included service in the U.S. House of Representatives. The family could trace its descent from Thomas Griffin, who had received land grant in 1651  Meanwhile, like his brother Cyrus received a private education appropriate to his class in Virginia, then sailed to England to complete his education. He studied law at the University of Edinburgh in Scotland and at the Middle Temple in London.

Legal and political career
Admitted to the Virginia bar, Griffin had a private legal practice in Lancaster County and surrounding areas in the Colony of Virginia from 1774 to 1777.

Lancaster County voters elected him as one of their two part-time representatives in the Virginia House of Delegates, and he served  from 1777 to 1778 (resigning to serve in the Continental Congress as discussed below), and later from 1786 to 1787 (during which session his brother represented Williamsburg). Fellow legislators elected him among Virginia's delegates to the Second Continental Congress, where he served from 1778 to 1780.

He was a Judge of the Court of Appeals in Cases of Capture from 1780 to 1787.

Griffin became a delegate to the Ninth Congress of the Confederation from 1787 to 1788, serving as the final President of the Congress of the Confederation under the Articles of Confederation in 1788. He aligned with the Federalist party and served as United States Commissioner to the Creek Nation in 1789.

Federal judicial service

He was nominated to the same position by President Washington on February 8, 1790. He was confirmed by the United States Senate on February 10, 1790, and received his commission the same day. His service terminated on December 14, 1810, due to his death in Yorktown, Virginia. He was interred in Bruton Parish Church in Williamsburg, Virginia.

Personal life

Griffin was the son of Col. Leroy Griffin and his wife Mary Ann Bertrand. He married Christina Stewart, oldest daughter of John Stewart, the sixth Earl of Traquair (1699–1779). They had at least a daughter Mary, who married Thomas Griffin, son of Dr. Corbin Griffin of Yorktown and a member of the Virginia House of Delegates as well as U.S. Congress, although their degree of consanguinity is unclear.

References

Sources
 Cyrus Griffin at Archontology.org".

External links
 

1748 births
1810 deaths
Members of the Virginia House of Delegates
Continental Congressmen from Virginia
18th-century American politicians
Virginia lawyers
Judges of the United States District Court for the District of Virginia
United States federal judges appointed by George Washington
18th-century American judges
People from Farnham, Virginia
Burials at Bruton Parish Church
Alumni of the University of Edinburgh
Virginia colonial people